Rodrigo Octávio Coelho da Rocha e Castro (born 21 December 1978 in Belo Horizonte, Minas Gerais) is a freestyle swimmer from Brazil, who competed for his native country at three consecutive Summer Olympics, starting in 2000 (Sydney).

International career

1999

He was at the 1999 Pan American Games in Winnipeg, where he earned a silver medal in the 4×200-metre freestyle. This silver medal was obtained with a time of 7:22.92, South American record, along with Gustavo Borges, André Cordeiro and Leonardo Costa.

2000 Summer Olympics

Participated in 2000 Summer Olympics in Sydney, where he finished 13th place in the 4×200-metre freestyle, and in 33rd place in the 200-metre freestyle.

2000-2004

At the 2002 FINA World Swimming Championships (25 m), in Moscow, he finished 10th in the 200-metre freestyle  and 4th in the 4×200-metre freestyle final.

Participating in the 2003 World Aquatics Championships, Castro was 18th in the 200-metre freestyle  and 9th in the 4×200-metre freestyle.

At the 2003 Pan American Games in Santo Domingo, Castro won the bronze medal in the 200-metre freestyle and silver in the 4×200-metre freestyle, along with Carlos Jayme, Rafael Mosca and Gustavo Borges.

2004 Summer Olympics

Castro was at the 2004 Summer Olympics in Athens, where he finished 9th in the 4×200-metre freestyle, 20th in the 200-metre freestyle, and 12th in the 4×100-metre freestyle.

2004-2008

At the 2004 FINA World Swimming Championships (25 m) in Indianapolis, he had his best results in Short-Course World Championships. Castro won the bronze medal in the 4×200-metre freestyle, and also was a finalist in the 200-metre freestyle, finishing in 8th place.

Castro was at the 2006 FINA World Swimming Championships (25 m), in Shanghai, where he finished 7th in the 200-metre freestyle final and 5th in the 4×200-metre freestyle final 

He swam at the 2006 Pan Pacific Swimming Championships, where he finished 6th in the 4×200-metre freestyle, 14th in the 200-metre freestyle, 23rd in the 100-metre freestyle, and was disqualified at the 4×100-metre freestyle.

Participating in the 2007 World Aquatics Championships, in Melbourne, finished 36th in the 200-metre freestyle  and 11th in the 4×200-metre freestyle 

At the 2007 Pan American Games, in Rio de Janeiro, Rodrigo Castro won the gold medal in the 4×200-metre freestyle  and finished 5th in the 200-metre freestyle.

Participating in the 2008 FINA World Swimming Championships (25 m) in Manchester, Castro finished 6th place in the 200-metre freestyle final.

2008 Summer Olympics

At the 2008 Summer Olympics, participated in his third Olympics. He was in 16th place in the 200-metre freestyle and 4×200-metre freestyle. He was also in the 4×100-metre freestyle, where the Brazilian team was disqualified. Broke the Gustavo Borges' South American Record in the 200-metre freestyle in olympic pool, which had lasted 10 years, with a time of 1:47.87. After this, thought about end of his career, but officially went swimming.

2008-2012

Participated in the 2009 World Aquatics Championships in Rome, where he finished 30th place in the 200-metre freestyle  and 10th in the 4×200-metre freestyle 

At the 2010 Pan Pacific Swimming Championships in Irvine, he finished 24th in the 200-metre freestyle, 41st in the 100-metre freestyle  and 44th in the 50-metre freestyle.

He was at the 2010 FINA World Swimming Championships (25 m) in Dubai, where he finished 23rd in the 200-metre freestyle  and 8th in the 4×200-metre freestyle.

At the 2011 World Aquatics Championships in Shanghai, he finished 14th in the 4×200-metre freestyle.

Retirement

In late 2012, Castro, age 33, announced his retirement from swimming.

See also
 Pan American Games records in swimming
 South American records in swimming

References
 UOL Profile

External links 
 
 

1978 births
Living people
Swimmers at the 1999 Pan American Games
Swimmers at the 2000 Summer Olympics
Swimmers at the 2003 Pan American Games
Swimmers at the 2004 Summer Olympics
Swimmers at the 2007 Pan American Games
Swimmers at the 2008 Summer Olympics
Olympic swimmers of Brazil
Sportspeople from Belo Horizonte
Brazilian male freestyle swimmers
Medalists at the FINA World Swimming Championships (25 m)
Pan American Games gold medalists for Brazil
Pan American Games silver medalists for Brazil
Pan American Games bronze medalists for Brazil
Pan American Games medalists in swimming
South American Games silver medalists for Brazil
South American Games medalists in swimming
Competitors at the 2010 South American Games
Medalists at the 1999 Pan American Games
Medalists at the 2003 Pan American Games
Medalists at the 2007 Pan American Games
20th-century Brazilian people
21st-century Brazilian people